Douglas M. Leone (born July 4, 1957) is an American billionaire venture capitalist and former managing partner of Sequoia Capital, from which role he stepped aside in 2022 while remaining a general partner. As of August 2022, his net worth was estimated at US$6.1 billion.

Early life
Leone was born July 4, 1957, in Genoa, Italy. His family moved to the United States when Leone was 11 and settled in Mount Vernon, New York. Leone earned a bachelor's degree in mechanical engineering from Cornell University in 1979, a master's in industrial engineering from Columbia University's School of Engineering and Applied Science in 1986, and a master's degree in management from the MIT Sloan School of Management in 1988.

Career
Leone began his career in sales and management positions at Sun Microsystems, Hewlett-Packard, and Prime Computer. He joined Sequoia Capital in 1988, became a managing partner in 1996, and then the global managing partner in 2012. 

In 2017, Forbes named him a top-10 investor in the technology industry in the United States. Leone has been involved in Sequoia investments in numerous companies, including Aruba Networks, Hyperion/Arbor Software, International Network Services, Medallia, Netezza, PlanGrid, Rackspace, RingCentral,
and ServiceNow. He also led Sequoia's international expansion into China and India.

In 2017, he was ranked #693 on Forbes list of the World's Billionaires, with a net worth of US$2.9 billion. In 2020, he was named on the Forbes Billionaires list with wealth of US$3.5 billion and ranked #538. His ranking on the list in 2022 was #350, with a net worth of US$6.9 billion.

Leone and his wife donated $100,000 to support President Donald Trump's 2020 re-election campaign, and Leone was appointed to Trump's task force on re-opening the economy in the wake of the COVID-19 pandemic. The Washington Post reported that Leone proposed using his connections in the Trump Administration to help smooth the sale of TikTok (in which Sequoia had invested heavily) to a US corporation. Leone renounced  his support for Trump following the 2021 storming of the United States Capitol.

In April 2022, Sequoia announced that Roelof Botha would replace Leone as its senior steward of global brand and operations, effective from July 5, following Leone's 65th birthday. Since then, Leone continues to be a general partner in Sequoia's existing funds.

Boards 
Leone is a board member for several companies, including 
ActionIQ,
 Cyera, Island, Nubank, strongDM, Trade Republic, and Wiz.

Personal life
Leone is married to Patricia Perkins-Leone. The couple has four children, and lives in Atherton, California. They have been seeking to build an oceanfront home in Makena, Maui, Hawaii, but as of November 2017, the Hawaii Supreme Court has ruled against the development.

In May 2021, Leone was conferred with the Order of the Star of Italy, in the class of Officer (Ufficiale dell'Ordine della Stella d'Italia).

References

Living people
1957 births
20th-century American businesspeople
American billionaires
American investors
American venture capitalists
Businesspeople from New York City
Columbia School of Engineering and Applied Science alumni
Cornell University College of Engineering alumni
Italian emigrants to the United States
MIT Sloan School of Management alumni
People from Atherton, California
Midas List